is a skyscraper business district in Shinjuku, Tokyo, Japan. This region was previously called .

Nishi-Shinjuku was Tokyo's first major foray into building skyscrapers with the first appearing in the 1970s with Keio Plaza Inter-Continental. It is the location of the Tokyo Metropolitan Government Building, the headquarters of the Tokyo Metropolitan Government.

Progress continues in Nishi-Shinjuku, which is heading away from the city centre and has the site of the proposed Nishi-Shinjuku 3-Chōme Redevelopment, with plans for what will be three of the four tallest buildings in Japan.

Economy
H.I.S. has its headquarters in the Shinjuku Oak Tower. Seiko Epson's Tokyo Office is in the Shinjuku NS Building. Capcom's Tokyo offices are located in the Shinjuku Mitsui Building and Keihin Corporation is headquartered in the Shinjuku Nomura Building. Taisei Corporation also has its headquarters in the district.

Skyscrapers

See also

References

Neighborhoods of Tokyo
Shinjuku